Toadtown (formerly, Allentown) is an unincorporated community in Butte County, California. It lies at an elevation of 2782 feet (848 m).

There was a gold mine at Toadtown in the 1930s. The El Monte mine made a strike of high-grade ore in September, 1930, which yielded several hundred dollars and some good specimens.

References

Unincorporated communities in California
Unincorporated communities in Butte County, California